Erixx GmbH (stylized as erixx) is a private railway company operating regional train service in Lower Saxony and Bremen, northern Germany. It is wholly owned by Osthannoversche Eisenbahnen AG (OHE). Since 11 December 2011, Erixx operates on behalf of the public transport company of Lower Saxony (Landesnahverkehrsgesellschaft Niedersachsen - LNVG). The name is derived from Erica, the genus of heath plants, and "x", representing the Heidekreuz (heath cross), the services operated over the Lüneburg Heath.

Services

Erixx has operated routes RB37 and RB38 since December 2011 until at least December 2019, which together form the Heidekreuz. They operate on the Heath Railway and Uelzen–Langwedel railway. From December 2014 until December 2029 Erixx will also operate the RE10, RB32, RB42, RB43 and RB47 services.

Regional services  Harz-Heide-Bahn Hannover – Hildesheim – Goslar – Bad Harzburg
Local services  Wendlandbahn Lüneburg – Hitzacker – Dannenberg Ost
Local services  Amerikalinie Bremen - Soltau - Uelzen
Local services  Heidebahn Buchholz - Soltau - Hannover
Local services  Harz-Heide-Bahn Braunschweig – Wolfenbüttel – Vienenburg – Bad Harzburg
Local services  Harz-Heide-Bahn Braunschweig – Wolfenbüttel – Vienenburg – Goslar
Local services  Mühlenbahn Braunschweig – Gifhorn – Wittingen – Uelzen

Rolling stock
Erixx operates a fleet of 27 LINT-41 diesel multiple units on RB37 and RB38. From December 2014 Erixx also uses 28 new LINT-54 diesel multiple units on the new routes.

References

External links
 

Railway companies of Germany